Anne Ferreira (born 18 March 1961) is a French politician and Member of the European Parliament for the Île-de-France. She is a member of the Socialist Party, which is part of the Party of European Socialists, and sits on the European Parliament's Committee on the Environment, Public Health and Food Safety.

She is a substitute for the Committee on Civil Liberties, Justice and Home Affairs, a member of the delegation for relations with South Africa, and a substitute for the delegation to the EU–Kazakhstan, EU–Kyrgyzstan and EU–Uzbekistan Parliamentary Cooperation Committees, and for relations with Tajikistan, Turkmenistan and Mongolia.

Career
 School teacher (1981–1999)
 Vice-chairwoman of the Aisne Departmental Council
 Member of the European Parliament (since 1999)

External links
 Official website (in French)
 European Parliament biography
 Declaration of financial interests (in French; PDF file)

1961 births
Living people
People from Saint-Quentin, Aisne
Politicians from Hauts-de-France
MEPs for Île-de-France 2004–2009
MEPs for France 1999–2004
20th-century women MEPs for France
21st-century women MEPs for France
Socialist Party (France) MEPs
French people of Portuguese descent